Acanthametropus pecatonica, the Pecatonica River Mayfly, is a species of mayfly in the family Acanthametropodidae.  It is endemic to the Pecatonica River of Wisconsin and Illinois, with populations observed in South Carolina and Georgia.

Acanthametropus pecatonica was considered extinct after 1927, but was "rediscovered" in 1987, about 60 years after it was considered lost. It has been found in at least five counties of Wisconsin, and historically at locations in Illinois, South Carolina, and Georgia.

References

Further reading

 

Mayflies
Insects described in 1953
Insects of North America
Taxonomy articles created by Polbot